Montgomery Ward Warehouse and Retail Store is a historic warehouse and retail building in Baltimore, Maryland, United States. It is an eight-story (plus penthouse) concrete structure and is roughly shaped like a squared-off number "4". The front features a penthouse tower at the main entrance bay with a balcony and capped by a flagpole. It was built about 1925 as a mail order and retail warehouse for Montgomery Ward on an  site adjacent to the Baltimore and Ohio Railroad tracks. The complex was one of nine large warehouses built by the company in the United States.

From 2001 to 2002, the vacant warehouse was restored as an office building by Himmelrich Associates, Inc. for Maryland Department of the Environment, M&T Bank and other tenants.

Montgomery Ward Warehouse and Retail Store was listed on the National Register of Historic Places in 2000.

Gallery

References

External links
, including photo from 2000, at Maryland Historical Trust
 Montgomery Park photos - Baltimore Heritage

Montgomery Ward
Buildings and structures in Baltimore
Warehouses on the National Register of Historic Places
Commercial buildings on the National Register of Historic Places in Baltimore
Commercial buildings completed in 1925
Southwest Baltimore